Krisztina Egyed (born 26 August 1976) is a Hungarian speed skater who competed at the 1992, 1994, 1998 and 2002 Winter Olympics representing Hungary. She specializes in the women's 500 metres, women's 1000 metres and women's 1500 metres speed skating events. She was also the flag bearer for Hungary at the 1998 and 2002 Winter Olympics.

Besides competing in the Winter Olympics, Krisztina competed in the World Sprint Speed Skating Championships and the European Speed Skating Championships numerous times.

References

1976 births
Living people
Hungarian female speed skaters
Olympic speed skaters of Hungary
Speed skaters at the 1992 Winter Olympics
Speed skaters at the 1994 Winter Olympics
Speed skaters at the 1998 Winter Olympics
Speed skaters at the 2002 Winter Olympics
Speed skaters from Budapest